Georgsdorf is a community in the district of Grafschaft Bentheim in Lower Saxony.

Geography

Location
Georgsdorf lies north of Nordhorn on the  Süd-Nord-Kanal (South-North Canal) and the Coevorden-Piccardie-Kanal. It belongs to the Joint Community (Samtgemeinde) of Neuenhaus, whose administrative seat is in the like-named town.

Politics

Mayor
The honorary mayor was Willi Beckert, but he died in May 2007, and since then Johann Scholten has been the new mayor.

Culture and sightseeing

Buildings
Georgsdorf's best-known landmark is a windmill built in the traditional Dutch style in 1875 out of brick and with a thatched roof.

Economy and infrastructure

Transport
The Autobahn A 31 runs by the community roughly 10 km to the west.

Solar power
Nationwide, Georgsdorf has the highest number of solar power systems in proportion to population.

References

External links
 Georgsdorf’s webpage
 Joint community’s webpage

County of Bentheim (district)